The Mas de Malherbes is a provençal mas and a small hotel near Aimargues, in the south of France.

History 
He first belongs to Hyacinthe Fontanès, Louis XV's personal treasurer.

Property of the Ménard-Dorian family, from Lunel - whose notably members are Paul Ménard-Dorian and his daughter Pauline Ménard-Dorian, writer, great-granddaughter in-law of Victor Hugo, Marcel Proust's muse, who died in the mas in 1941. Marguerite, Jean Hugo's sister - the two children of Pauline -, is the heir of the domain. She received here Jean Cocteau, Paul Éluard, Max Jacob, Léon Daudet, Erik Satie, Léon Blum, Folco de Baroncelli-Javon and Fanfonne Guillierme.

Bibliography 
 Max Daumas and Henri Michel, Le domaine du Grand Malherbes, un mas célèbre de la Petite Camargue, 2004.

References 

Hotels in France
Aimargues
Buildings and structures in Gard